The Weaver Popcorn Company, based in  Van Buren, Indiana, is one of the largest popcorn companies in the United States.

History
Founded in 1928 by Ira E. Weaver, whose family still controls the company, it develops, grows, processes, packages, and ships a variety of popcorn products for sale around the world. Its customers include store chains around the world, as well as concessionaires, and international popcorn distributors. In 2007, the Weaver Popcorn Company became the first company to remove diacetyl, a controversial butter flavoring, from its Pop Weaver microwave popcorn products.

Products

Pop Weaver
Weaver uses canola oil in its products. Flavors for microwave oven products include Butter, Light Butter, Extra Butter, Kettle Corn, Caramel, Cinnamon Roll, Jalapeño Cheddar and Parmesan and Herb. Flavors for concession sale include Weaver Gold, Caramel & Sweet, Premium Hybrid Yellow, Candy cane flavor, Almond, and chocolate dipped. Flavors for pre-popped include Caramel Corn with Peanuts and Dash of Salt.

Trail's End
Trail's End is a brand sold by the Boy Scouts of America and Scouts Canada in fundraising. Available flavors from year to year vary, but include: Caramel Corn, Butter Light (microwave), Unbelievable Butter (microwave), Kettle Corn (microwave), Caramel Corn with Almonds & Pecans, Butter Toffee Caramel Corn, Salted Caramel Corn, White Cheddar Cheese, Cheddar Cheese, Jalapeño Cheddar, Cheese Lover's Collection, Sweet and Savory Collection and Popping Corn. They also have chocolate products that include Chocolatey Peanut Clusters and Chocolatey Caramel Crunch. Consumers can also donate popcorn to the U.S. military by making a cash contribution. Trail's End sends popcorn to the armed services stationed both domestic and international, including combat areas. Scouts generally retain over 73% of the proceeds.

See also

 List of popcorn brands

References

External links

 Official web site
 Trail's End website

Popcorn brands
American companies established in 1928
Companies based in Indiana
1928 establishments in Indiana
Food and drink companies established in 1928
Grant County, Indiana